Formiciinae is an extinct subfamily of ants known from Eocene deposits in Europe and North America.

Genera
Formiciinae Lutz, 1986
Formiciini Lutz, 1986
Titanomyrma Archibald, et al., 2011
Titanomyrma gigantea (Lutz, 1986)
Titanomyrma lubei Archibald, et al., 2011
Titanomyrma simillima (Lutz, 1986)
Formicium Westwood, 1854 (collective group genus)
Formicium berryi (Carpenter, 1929)
Formicium brodiei Westwood, 1854
Formicium mirabile (Cockerell, 1920)

The type genus is Formicium with the genus Titanomyrma being described in 2011.  Formicium includes the described species which are known from fossil wings only.  Formicium is known from three species.  Formicium mirabile, named by Theodore D. A. Cockerell in 1920, and Formicium brodiei, named by John O. Westwood in 1854, are both known from fore wings found in the middle Eocene of Bournemouth, Dorset, England.  The third species named, Formicium berryi was named by Frank M. Carpenter in 1929 from the middle Eocene Claiborne Formation in Puryear, Tennessee, USA, though he misidentified the formation as the Wilcox Formation.  F. berryi was the first described occurrence of the genus and, until 2011, the subfamily, in North America.   With the description of Titanomyrma, the two species already described from complete body specimens, Formicium giganteum and F. simillimum,  were transferred to the new genus as Titanomyrma giganteum and T. simillimum respectively.  Titanomyrma also contains a third species, T. lubei described in the same paper as the genus and which is the second member of the subfamily known from North America.

Size
While workers belonging to the subfamily have not been found, queens and males for T. giganteum and T. simillimum are known and T. lubei is known from a single queen. The average size for the queens and males in Titanomyrma is equal to that of some of the largest modern ants known.

This is similar to the restricted ranges of the largest species of modern ants. The spread of the subfamily from Europe to North America is postulated to have been across the North Atlantic landbridges which were present in the Eocene. While the average temperatures for this route are thought to have been lower than the range needed for Formiciinae species, a series of warmer events throughout the Eocene are suggested as aides in the crossing.

References

External links

 
†Formiciinae
Eocene insects
Fossil ant taxa
Eocene first appearances
Eocene extinctions